Dennis Hughes (1894-1953) was a professional football player who played during the early years of the National Football League. A graduate of George Washington University, Hughes made his NFL debut in 1925 with the Pottsville Maroons, where he helped the Maroons win the NFL Championship, before it was stripped from the team due to a disputed rules violation. He played for the Pottsville Maroons for his entire career.

Notes

Pottsville Maroons players
George Washington Colonials football players
1957 deaths
1894 births